Lark Wood is a  biological Site of Special Scientific Interest in Gloucestershire, notified in 1974. The site is listed in the 'Cotswold District' Local Plan 2001-2011 (on line) as a Key Wildlife Site (KWS).

Habitat
The site is in the north-east of the Cotswolds, and is a relatively small area of deciduous Oak woodland which is managed to coppice-with-standards. It lies on Inferior Oolite of the Jurassic limestone. Whilst the tree type is mainly Oak, there are some Beech and Sycamore. Shrubs include Hazel and Hawthorn. The ground flora is mostly Bramble, Dog's Mercury and Woodruff.

Rarities
The site was designated as it supported a large population of Mezereon which is nationally rare. Other uncommon species are Spurge and Butcher's Broom.

A Natural England assessment report of March 2012 states that the Mezereum cannot be located, having been declining over several years, and it is considered that the site is no longer suitable for this plant.  As a consequence a recommendation has been made for de-notification.

References

SSSI Source
 Natural England SSSI information on the citation
 Natural England SSSI information on the Lark Wood unit

External links
 Natural England (SSSI information)

Sites of Special Scientific Interest in Gloucestershire
Sites of Special Scientific Interest notified in 1974
Forests and woodlands of Gloucestershire
Cotswolds
Temple Guiting